"Avengers: Standoff!" is a 2016 comic book storyline in Marvel Comics that was created by Nick Spencer, Mark Bagley, and Jesus Saiz.

Premise
This storyline depicts the Avengers investigating the mysterious gated community of Pleasant Hill, trying to determine the nature of its involvement with S.H.I.E.L.D.

Plot
Upon being alerted of a catastrophic event, Winter Soldier returns to Earth. Winter Soldier traces the source of the catastrophic event to a S.H.I.E.L.D. facility where he ends up fighting off the S.H.I.E.L.D. agents there. In the middle of the woods, a young man awakens with amnesia. Upon being brought to the gated community of Pleasant Hill, he is examined by Dr. Erik Selvig and other doctors. Upon overhearing some suspicious conversations, the young man starts to run away only to be knocked out. When he woke up, he was told by a resident named Dorothy Bixby to accommodate the town. The young man discovered that Pleasant Hill is surrounded by a forcefield that is visible through touch. 19 days later, a young man named Jim becomes a member of the Pleasant Hill community. While walking through the park, Jim encountered an eerie girl who was taken away when she brought a bird back to life. 36 days later, Jim encountered an arsonist in a house he entered who told him that Pleasant Hill was a lie and requested a meet-up in case Jim wanted to learn the truth. On Day 40, Jim met the mysterious mechanic named Phil who created a device that enabled people to return to their true selves. Phil also stole a training video where Mayor Maria Hill gave a video tour of Pleasant Hill describing it to the S.H.I.E.L.D. cadets watching as the future of supervillain incarceration, where they are turned into mild-mannered civilians using reality-warping technology derived from the Cosmic Cube called "Kobik". A demonstration was shown when Graviton was turned into a Pleasant Hill chef named Howie Howardson. As Phil uses the device on himself and Jim to restore their true selves, it is revealed that Phil is actually Fixer and Jim is actually Baron Helmut Zemo. Both of them vow to use the device on the other brainwashed supervillain prisoners and reduce Pleasant Hill to dust.

At the S.H.I.E.L.D. Helicarrier, Commander Steve Rogers followed the trail of Winter Soldier and found a message on a napkin that he used. Meanwhile, Captain America has defeated Green Skull and is contacted by Whisperer. At Bev's Diner, Steve Rogers meets with Winter Soldier, while Captain America meets the Whisperer (an alias of Rick Jones). Both of them learn that S.H.I.E.L.D. never discarded the Kobik project as they believed, which Whisperer made public. Steve Rogers and Captain America follow a lead to a town in Connecticut. After the meetings, they are both picked up by S.H.I.E.L.D. agents. Now learning about Kobik's continued existence, Steve Rogers confronts Maria Hill upon being brought to Pleasant Hill. Maria Hill presented the inhabitants of Pleasant Hill to Steve Rogers where she mentions that the citizens are reformed supervillains. When Steve Rogers demanded to know where the fragments of the Cosmic Cube used for Kobik were, she directed him to the eerie little girl who was actually the fragments of the Cosmic Cube having taken the form of a near-omnipotent child. Maria Hill and Steve Rogers don't know it yet, but some of the inhabitants consisting of Absorbing Man (who was transformed into an ice cream vendor named Harold), Atlas (who was transformed into a mailman), Glob, Klaw, Mentallo, Mister Hyde, Moonstone, Nitro, Orrgo, Scorcher (who was transformed into a firefighter), Shockwave, Tiger Shark (who was transformed into an actual tiger shark), and Trapster (who was transformed into a groundskeeper named Willie) have regained their memories thanks to Fixer. Baron Zemo leads them into a coordinated assault on the S.H.I.E.L.D. outpost that served as the Pleasant Hill City Hall.

Phil Coulson's group learns about Pleasant Hill and Rick Jones' involvement. Deathlok, Daisy Johnson, and Jemma Simmons investigated Rick Jones' house and discovered a hidden escape route. They follow Rick Jones through the Morlock Tunnels and apprehend him. During an interrogation at the S.H.I.E.L.D. Battlecarrier, the New Avengers arrived to retrieve Rick Jones from S.H.I.E.L.D.

Answering Commander Steve Rogers' call, the Avengers Unity Division arrive in Connecticut where they discover Wrecker trying to escape in an SUV with Maria Hill. The Avengers Unity Division helps Wrecker and Maria Hill avoid the S.H.I.E.L.D. forces. While on their way to Pleasant Hill, the Avengers Unity Division is attacked by another Maria Hill who is on a Quinjet with the Avengers.

In New York City, the Avengers have defeated an escapee from Pleasant Hill when Maria Hill arrives in order to keep the Avengers from getting involved in recent events. Unfortunately, the Avengers received the transmission from Commander Steve Rogers about Pleasant Hill. This causes Maria Hill to reluctantly fly the Avengers to Connecticut. When the Avengers and Maria Hill arrive in Pleasant Hill, they noticed the Avengers Unity Division and another Maria Hill with them. The Maria Hill that is with the Avengers opens fire leading to a brief scuffle between the Avengers and the Avengers Unity Division before they end up trapped by Kobik and turned into inhabitants of Pleasant Hill.

On the S.H.I.E.L.D. Battlecarrier, the New Avengers confronted the agents of S.H.I.E.L.D. and retrieved Rick Jones from their custody. It turns out that the New Avengers were contacted by Rick Jones through a pre-recorded video that was to be sent to them in the event that the alien nanobots he ingested noticed him being unconscious. The Pentagon learns about the New Avengers' invasion of the S.H.I.E.L.D. Battlecarrier. Considering it an act of war, General Robert Maverick advises the Pentagon that they should retaliate by unleashing a monster called the American Kaiju on the New Avengers.

Orrgo has been poking his nose through Dr. Paul Kraye's files. Upon discovering this, Dr. Kraye contacted Maria Hill claiming that Orrgo has gone rogue. This causes Maria Hill to have Orrgo imprisoned at Pleasant Hill where Kobik's powers made him a dog. Upon learning about this and locating Pleasant Hill, the Life Model Decoy of Dum Dum Dugan leads the Howling Commandos to rescue Orrgo. They fight their way past the villains Biohazard, a Bulldozer, Gargantua, Grey Gargoyle, Jack O'Lantern, Melter, Mister Hyde, Scorcher, and Wrecker while rescuing Orrgo. Then they confront Kobik who ends up teleporting them back to S.T.A.K.E. HQ. Once back at S.T.A.K.E. HQ, Dum Dum Dugan and Orrgo discover that Dr. Kraye has released all the inmates there to wreak havoc as the Howling Commandos spring into action.

Amongst the villain rampage caused by Baron Zemo and Fixer where Captain America and Winter Soldier save S.H.I.E.L.D. Agent Avril Kincaid from the Blood Brothers, Maria Hill gets injured as Steve Rogers reasons with Baron Zemo to let Maria Hill get medical attention. Father Patrick then takes Steve Rogers to Erik Selvig's clinic to enlist his help in tending to Maria Hill. With helpful information from Erik Selvig, Steve Rogers heads to the Pleasant Hill bowling alley to get to Kobik so that she can restore the peace of Pleasant Hill. After attempting to reason with Kobik, Steve Rogers is then attacked by Crossbones. Just as Crossbones was on the brink of finishing off Steve Rogers, Kobik uses her powers to restore him back to his younger self putting him back in his physical prime. Declaring that "It's good to be back," Steve Rogers defeats Crossbones. By this time, Captain America and Winter Soldier catch up with him. Nobody knows it, but Father Patrick is actually the clone of Red Skull in disguise and was the one who orchestrated the villain uprising.

Despite having been converted to a simple life as "Claire," Rogue is eventually able to overcome Kobik's brainwashing thanks to a series of lessons she received from Professor X about how to overcome psychic attacks, her mind "planting" various clues that would lead her to the truth, such as glimpsing Professor X out of the corner of her eye or noting Xs everywhere. With her memory restored, Rogue gathers some of the other Avengers and Avengers Unity Division only for the reassembled team to be attacked by Kobik who is determined to put them "back to sleep."

Project Troubleshooter was the latest facility that would develop human soldiers as well as an attempt to recreate the Super Soldier Serum that Abraham Erskine created. General Robert Maverick oversaw the procedure that was used on Corporal Todd Ziller. The formula used on Todd Ziller had combination of Gamma enhancements, Mutant Growth Hormone, Pym Particles, and the Lizard Formula. This formula transformed Todd Ziller into a reptilian kaiju called the American Kaiju. Back in the present, American Kaiju was attacking Avengers Idea Mechanics' facilities until he encountered the Avenger Five mech that Sunspot deploys to fight American Kaiju.

During the earlier days of Pleasant Hill, Absorbing Man had been transformed into a man named Harold who runs his own ice cream parlor and was in love with Sheriff Eva. After Baron Zemo and Fixer restored everyone's memories, Absorbing Man was among the villains that went on a rampage as he went on the attack with Whirlwind (who was previously transformed into a teenager named Scottie) until they were persuaded by Sheriff Eva's true form of Elektra to spare the innocent lives. Illuminati members Hood and Titania arrived to retrieve Absorbing Man. Although still shaken for being put into a S.H.I.E.L.D.-induced normal life, Absorbing Man sides with the Illuminati as they plan to assemble the other inmates for revenge on S.H.I.E.L.D. where they start with Whirlwind.

After Quicksilver saved the Avengers from Kobik's grasp and spread them out throughout Pleasant Hill, they discovered that the two Maria Hills that the Avengers and the Avengers Unity Division were actually the Femme Fatales members Mindblast and Bloodlust, who had been used by S.H.I.E.L.D. to keep the Avengers away from Pleasant Hill. When the inmates started noticing the two Avengers teams and started attacking them, Deadpool reached out to Kobik where he used their shared past of being controlled to get empathy from her. Kobik brought both teams back to good health just in time for them to answer Steve Rogers' call to assist him.

After Avengers Idea Mechanics has evacuated Avengers Island, Avenger Five shorts out American Kaiju's gamma enhancements enough to regress him back to Todd Ziller. Songbird is revealed to be a double-agent for S.H.I.E.L.D. as she attacks Hawkeye upon his siding with Avengers Idea Mechanics. When Hawkeye planned to evacuate Rick Jones to Avengers Base Two, Rick Jones got a reaction from an Avengers Idea Mechanics agent and decides not to evacuate to Avengers Base Two as S.H.I.E.L.D. continues to search Avengers Island for him.

Steve Rogers, Captain America, and Winter Soldier begin looking for Kobik again only to discover that Baron Zemo had Fixer invent a device that would help find Kobik as Kraven the Hunter rallies the villains to help with their goals. Upon not being able to successfully locate Kobik, Steve Rogers decides to rally the heroes so that they can take the fight to Baron Zemo.

Thanks to a trick by Kraven the Hunter, Kobik ends up captured and placed into Fixter's device. Meanwhile, Avril Kincaid manages to get to the Pleasant Hill Museum where she meets its curator Wendell Vaughn where he gives her his Quantum Bands which served as a contingency in case S.H.I.E.L.D. lost control of Kobik. As both Avengers teams negotiate with Baron Zemo to let the civilian hostages go, Doctor Voodoo, Quicksilver, and Vision rescue the civilians when nobody was looking. As Fixer's device began to turn Kobik back into the Cosmic Cube, Baron Zemo had Graviton use his powers to create an impenetrable shield to keep both Avengers teams at bay. With help from Avril Kincaid, both Avengers teams got through where they destroyed Fixer's device and free Kobik who then blasted Winter Soldier. As Baron Zemo tries to get Kobik to side with the bad guys and Erik Selvig tries to get Kobik to side with S.H.I.E.L.D., Kobik used her powers to teleport Baron Zemo and Erik Selvig away from Pleasant Hill. As a result of this, the other villains try to escape only to be thwarted by a blockade as the result of MACH-VII sending a distress signal. Both Avengers teams proceed to defeat the villains. In the aftermath of the Pleasant Hill incident, Maria Hill was reprimanded by the World Security Council where her status as Director of S.H.I.E.L.D. is pending review while she continues her work under supervision of the World Security Council's operatives. Baron Zemo and Erik Selvig have been teleported to an unknown part of the Himalayas making their way back to civilization as Baron Zemo plans to use Erik Selvig in his next plan. Steve Rogers of the Avengers Unity Division and Captain America of the Avengers plan to keep what happened at Pleasant Hill under wraps at the time being. Rick Jones is offered by Steve Rogers to join up with S.H.I.E.L.D. as part of his reparations for his hactivism. Wendell Vaughn is training Avril Kincaid to become the new Quasar. Red Skull's clone starts to re-establish HYDRA where he and Sin get Crossbones on their side. As for Kobik, she approaches Winter Soldier and offers to help him do good. Winter Soldier agrees to the terms as Kobik suggests that she brings some "friends" she made in Pleasant Hill with them.

Titles involved
The following titles are listed in order of release:

 Avengers Standoff: Welcome to Pleasant Hill #1
 Avengers Standoff: Assault on Pleasant Hill Alpha #1
 Agents of S.H.I.E.L.D. #3
 Uncanny Avengers Vol. 3 #7
 All-New, All-Different Avengers #7
 New Avengers Vol. 4 #8
 Howling Commandos of S.H.I.E.L.D. #6
 Captain America: Sam Wilson #7
 Uncanny Avengers Vol. 3 #8
 New Avengers Vol. 4 #9
 Illuminati #6
 Agents of S.H.I.E.L.D. #4
 All-New, All-Different Avengers #8
 New Avengers Vol. 4 #10
 Captain America: Sam Wilson #8
 Avengers Standoff: Assault on Pleasant Hill Omega #1

Collected editions

References

Superhero comics
2016 in comics